Andrew Frederick Silvester (born 16 June 1947, Kidderminster, Worcestershire, England) is a British bassist and multi-instrumentalist. Silvester has played in various bands during his career, most notably as co-founder of both Chicken Shack and Big Town Playboys as well as a tenure in the British blues band Savoy Brown and Los Angeles based soft rock ensemble, Big Wha-Koo. He has also performed with Martha Veléz, the Steve Gibbons Band, ex-Fleetwood Mac guitarist Danny Kirwan, Savoy Brown vocalist Chris Youlden and The Honeydrippers.

References

1947 births
Living people
People from Kidderminster
English bass guitarists
English male guitarists
Male bass guitarists
English blues musicians
British rhythm and blues boom musicians
Savoy Brown members
Chicken Shack members
The Honeydrippers members